The Lanark Group is a late Silurian to early Devonian lithostratigraphic group (a sequence of rock strata) in southern Scotland. The name is derived from the town of Lanark. It consists of sandstones and conglomerates within the Greywacke Conglomerate and Swanshaw Sandstone formations together with a wide range of igneous lithologies within the overlying Pentland Hills Volcanic Formation. The group is itself a division of the Old Red Sandstone Supergroup.

Pentland Hills Volcanic Formation 
The northern and eastern parts of the Pentland Hills, south of Edinburgh, are formed by a variety of rocks brought together within this formation. In stratigraphic order, i.e. youngest at top, they comprise the following 'volcanic members':
Blackford Hill Volc. Mem.
Braid Hills Volc. Mem.
Fairmilehead Volc. Mem.
Carnethy Hill Volc. Mem.
Woodhouselee Volc. Mem.
Caerketton Volc. Mem.
Allermuir Volc. Mem.
Capelaw Volc. Mem.
Bell's Hill Volc. Mem.
Bonaly Volc. Mem.
Warklaw Hill Volc. Mem.
Torduff Hill Volc. Mem.

Each is named from a locality where it is to be found  within the Pentland range or within the city of Edinburgh.

References

Devonian System of Europe
Silurian System of Europe
Geology of Scotland
Geological groups of the United Kingdom
Geologic formations of the United Kingdom